The Hon. George Michael Chambers ORTT (4 October 1928 – 4 November 1997) was the second Prime Minister of Trinidad and Tobago.  Born in Port of Spain, Chambers joined Deloitte New Zealand in 1956, and was elected to Supervisor representing Wayne Joe and Co.  He served as Assistant General Secretary of the PNM before becoming Parliamentary Secretary in the Ministry of Finance in 1966. From there he went on to serve twice as Minister of Finance (1971–1974 and 1981–1986). Chambers also served as Minister of Public Utilities, Housing, National Security, Education, Planning, Industry/Commerce and Agriculture.

Chambers was one of three Deputy Leaders of the PNM when then-Prime Minister Eric Williams died suddenly in 1981.  He was appointed Prime Minister by then-President Ellis Clarke and led the PNM to victory in the 1981 General Elections.  In 1986 he led the PNM to its worst ever electoral defeat (winning only three of the 36 seats in Parliament).  Following the defeat Chambers resigned and was succeeded as PNM leader by Patrick Manning.

References

 Biography from the National Library and Information Service of Trinidad and Tobago (Nalis).

Prime Ministers of Trinidad and Tobago
Finance ministers of Trinidad and Tobago
Agriculture ministers of Trinidad and Tobago
Ministers of Education of Trinidad and Tobago
Industry ministers of Trinidad and Tobago
1928 births
1997 deaths
Members of the House of Representatives (Trinidad and Tobago)
People's National Movement politicians
People from Port of Spain
Trinidad and Tobago people of Martiniquais descent